"King of All Excuses" is the fourth and final single to be released from American rock band Staind's fifth studio album Chapter V.

Lyrical meaning 

The exact meaning behind "King of All Excuses" is unknown. Due to the single's lack of popularity, questions concerning the song have not been asked during interviewing of the band, and lead singer Aaron Lewis has not openly given any elaborate background information or history involving the song's inspiration. When performed in concert, Aaron Lewis has introduced the song briefly by sharing a brief amount of insight about the meaning behind "King of All Excuses", by saying: "This next song... is about a piece of shit excuse for a person." Sometimes it is left to just "a piece of shit."

The song has an angry and violent tone to its lyrics and rhythm, possibly making "King of All Excuses" one of Staind's few heavy singles and overall heaviest song on Chapter V. The lyrics reveal the certain person Aaron Lewis singles out and addresses during the song as a pathological liar that negatively took advantage of his trust and friendship.

Chart performance

References

Staind songs
2006 singles
2005 songs
Songs written by Aaron Lewis
Elektra Records singles
Songs written by Mike Mushok